The duckweed firetail (Telebasis byersi) is a small damselfly of the family Coenagrionidae. It is native mainly to the southeastern United States, but its distribution extends north to Illinois and west to New Mexico.

References

External links
insectsofwestvirginia.net

Coenagrionidae
Insects described in 1957